To sing is to produce musical sounds with a voice.

Sing may also refer to:

Film
 Sing (1989 film), an American musical drama film following a fictional SING! production in New York City
 Sing!, a 2001 American documentary short film about the Los Angeles Children's Chorus
 Sing (franchise), an American CGI-animated musical film franchise
 Sing (2016 American film), the first film in the series
 Sing (2016 Hungarian film), a short film and 2017 Oscar winner

Music

Artists
 Super Impassioned Net Generation, a Chinese girl group

Albums 
 Sing (Gary Barlow & The Commonwealth Band album) or the title song (see below), 2012
 Sing (Jim Bianco album) or the title song, 2008
 Sing! (album), by Esther & Abi Ofarim, 1966
 Sing (If You Want It), by Omar, or the title song, 2006
 Sings (Conway Twitty album), 1958
 Sings (Emi Tawata album), 2009
 Sjung (English: Sing), by Laleh, or the title song, 2012
 Sing, by Maria Doyle Kennedy, or the title song, 2012
 Sing, by Neil Zaza, 1996
 Sing, by Super Impassioned Net Generation, 2017
 Sings, by Angélique Kidjo' 2015

Songs 
 "Sing" (Annie Lennox song), 2007
 "Sing" (The Dresden Dolls song), 2006
 "Sing" (Ed Sheeran song), 2014
 "Sing" (Gary Barlow song), 2012
 "Sing" (My Chemical Romance song), 2010
 "Sing" (Sesame Street song), 1971; covered by Barbra Streisand (1972) and the Carpenters (1973)
 "Sing" (Theo Tams song), 2008 
 "Sing" (Travis song), 2001
 "Sing" (Wynonna Judd song), 2009
 "Sing!" (song), from the musical A Chorus Line, 1975
 "Sing", by Blur from Leisure, 1991
 "Sing", by Dope from Group Therapy, 2003
 "Sing", by Hollywood Undead from Day of the Dead, 2015
 "Sing", by Jars of Clay from Who We Are Instead, 2003
 "Sing", by Nakatomi, 1996
 "Sing", by Parokya ni Edgar from Pogi Years Old, 2016
 "Sing", by Pentatonix from Pentatonix, 2015
 "Sing", by She & Him from Volume Two, 2010
 "Sing", by Unwritten Law from Swan, 2011
 "Sing", from Blue's Big Musical Movie, 2000

People
 Matt Sing (born 1975), Australian rugby player
 Sing Chew, Chinese singer

Other uses
 SING!, an annual student performance in New York City high schools
 Sing (video game), or Sing Party, a 2012 Wii U game
 Sistema Interconectado del Norte Grande, a power grid in the Norte Grande zone of Chile
 Spitzer Infrared Nearby Galaxies Survey, a survey of 75 galaxies using the Spitzer Space Telescope

See also
 Singh, surname
 List of people with surname Singh
 Synge (surname)
 Sing Sing (disambiguation)
 Sing Sing Sing (disambiguation)